Dominik Shine (born April 18, 1993) is an American professional ice hockey player who is currently playing for the Grand Rapids Griffins in the American Hockey League (AHL).

Early life
Shine was born on April 18, 1993, to parents Scott and Marcy Shine. His family lived in Ypsilanti, Michigan before settling in Pinckney, where Shine began playing competitive youth hockey. He won two consecutive AAA National Championships with the Little Ceasers bantam team and Compuware minor midget team. While attending Lincoln Southwest High School, Shine played four seasons with the Lincoln Stars of the United States Hockey League (USHL). During the 2011–12 and 2012–13 season, he served as team captain.

Playing career

Collegiate
Shine joined the Northern Michigan Wildcats for his freshman season during their 2013–14 campaign. He played in all 38 games and recorded 17 points for fifth on the team. On November 23, 2013, Shine and fellow rookie Sami Salminen recorded their first two collegiate goals in a 3–0 win over the Alabama-Huntsville Chargers. Shine returned to the Wildcats for his sophomore season where he opened the season with a three-game goal streak. He finished the 2014–15 season third on the team in points, tied for third in goals, and fourth in assists. 

In his junior year, Shine was named an alternate captain alongside Shane Sooth and Brock Maschmeyer. While serving in this role, he became the third Wildcat to earn GLI All-Tournament Team Honors since Dan Ruoho in 1992 and Roger Trudeau in 1998. By January, Shine ranked fifth in the Western Collegiate Hockey Association (WCHA) in goals, tied for 11th in points, and tied for second in game-winning goals. As a result, he earned a spot on the fan ballot for the 2016 Hobey Baker award. At the conclusion of the season, Shine was invited to participate in the Edmonton Oilers orientation camp from July 2nd to 7th.

Shine returned to the Wildcats for his senior season, where he continued his offensive output. From December to January, Shine tied for the NCAA lead with eight goals and 16th in the nation in goal-scoring. As a result of his play, he was named the Western Collegiate Hockey Association Offensive Player of the Week for the second time in his career. A few months later, Shine became the first WCHA skater to reach the 20-goal plateau during the season and one of only 15 in the Division I ranks. As a result, he was named to the All-WCHA Team.

Professional
Shine officially concluded his collegiate career on March 14, 2017, by signing an amateur tryout agreement with the Grand Rapids Griffins in the American Hockey League (AHL) for the remainder of the 2016–17 season.  He appeared in eight regular-season games with the Griffins, recording three assists and seven penalty minutes. He remained with the team as they qualified for the Calder Cup Finals but did not appear in a game as they beat the Syracuse Crunch for their second championship in five seasons. Following this, Shine signed a standard player's contract for the 2017–18 season.

In his first professional season with the Griffins, Shine was invited to the Detroit Red Wings' 2017 prospects tournament where he finished with four shots on goal and was plus-1. Following the tournament, Shine was one of 74 players invited to their Development Camp but was re-assigned to the Griffins prior to the start of the season. During the first three months of the season, Shine recorded two goals in 23 games and was subsequently scratched 11 times. Despite his slow start, he concluded the season with 16 points in 58 regular-season games and played in five postseason contests. Following this, Shine signed a one-year contract extension to remain with the Griffins.

In his second full professional season with the Griffins, Shine tied with teammates Turner Elson and Dominic Turgeon for most games played during the regular season with 72. He played in his 100th career AHL game during a 4–3 shootout win against the Cleveland Monsters on December 29. Upon concluding his second season with 11 points and 53 penalty minutes, Shine signed another one-year contract.

In February 2020, Shine, who played roller hockey with the Detroit Bordercats at Joe Dumars Fieldhouse, was drafted in the fifth round of the National Roller Hockey League Draft. On April 18, Shine signed a one-year contract extension with the Griffins for the 2020–21 season. During the season, he was forced to transition to defence due to injuries and COVID-19 protocols. In three games in which he played defense, Shine was a plus five. In March 2021, Shine became the third Griffins player during the 2020–21 season to play in his 200th game for the organization.

Career statistics

References

External links

1993 births
Living people
People from Pinckney, Michigan
American ice hockey right wingers
Grand Rapids Griffins players
Ice hockey players from Michigan
Lincoln Stars players
Northern Michigan Wildcats men's ice hockey players